Thomas Jefferson Pratt (January 26, 1844 – September 28, 1908) was a professional baseball player who played for the Philadelphia Athletics. He played in one game for the Athletics on October 18, 1871, getting two hits in six at-bats. Pratt, along with Elvio Jiménez and Clarence Dow, are the only players to have six at-bats in their only MLB game.
Prior to his brief professional career, he played with the old Brooklyn Atlantics in the 1860s. He had an extensive career as an umpire after retiring as a player.

External links
 Most at-bats in only MLB game Baseball Reference

Sources

Major League Baseball first basemen
Baseball players from Massachusetts
Philadelphia Athletics (NABBP) players
Brooklyn Atlantics (NABBP) players
Philadelphia Athletics (NA) players
19th-century baseball players
1844 births
1908 deaths